Loitsche is a village and a former municipality in the Börde district in Sachsen-Anhalt, Germany.  Since 1 January 2010, it is part of the municipality Loitsche-Heinrichsberg. This is where Tokio Hotel singer Bill Kaulitz and guitarist Tom Kaulitz grew up.

Loitsche is about 20 km north of Magdeburg. 
Loitsche has about 674 inhabitants (2005).
Loitsche has a size of 19,43 km².

Former municipalities in Saxony-Anhalt
Börde (district)